FC Sevlievo is a Bulgarian association football club based in Sevlievo, which currently competes in the North-West Third League, the third tier of Bulgarian football league system. Their home ground is Stadion Rakovski, which currently has a capacity of 5000.

Founded as SC Rakovski in December 1922, the club was declared bankrupt in 2015 and re-founded as FC Sevlievo.

History

Rakovski
The club was founded on 29 December 1922 as SC Rakovski by a group of football enthusiasts of the Association for Tourism in Rositsa. Upon its formation, Ivan Tsochev, Boris Popivanov, and Serafim Ganushev became the president, secretary, and steward respectively. Brothers Sokurov, who played on the team, chose to name it Rakovski in honor of the Bulgarian national hero Georgi Sava Rakovski. They played their first game against Viktoria F.C. from Veliko Tarnovo, ending in a 1:1 draw.

After the reorganization of some of the sports associations in Bulgaria, some voluntary sports organizations arose in Sevlievo. The most popular was DSO Red Flag. In 1957, every voluntary sports organizations union in VSO Rakovski. Two years later Rakovski was admitted into the Bulgarian Third Division. In 1968 the club was promoted for the first time to B PFG, the second division of Bulgarian football. 

In 1980, the club was renamed F.C. Rositsa.

Vidima-Rakovski

The team became known as PFC Vidima-Rakovski in 1997, after the union between F.C. Rakovski and F.C. Vidima, a little club of the Vidima Standart Ideal works. In the next 1998-99 season, the team won the Cup of Amateur Bulgarian league.

In the 2002-03 season, with Plamen Markov as head coach, Vidima won promotion to the A Group for the first time ever. Gerasim Zakov scored the club’s first top league goal in a 3-3 draw against Lokomotiv Sofia. The 2003-04 campaign, remembered as the first A PFG season in the club's history, ended in a good 12th place. In the same season, Vidima-Rakovski had their best Bulgarian Cup run, beating Kameno and Belasitsa Petrich before losing to Lokomotiv Sofia in the quarter-finals. In the next campaign, Vidima won just nine games and was relegated back to the second level after two years among the best.

After the 2006-07 season, Vidima-Rakovski finished 2nd in B PFG, and managed to participate in the play-off for promotion to the A PFG. On June 2, 2007, Vidima won the play-off against PFC Naftex Burgas with a result of 1-0 and qualified for the first division for the second time in the club's history. However, Vidima largely struggled during the 2007-08 season, at the end not managing to avoid relegation once more.

In 2010, Vidima won a third promotion to the top division by winning the Western B PFG. They finished at 14th place in A PFG in the next season and secured their top division status after winning a relegation play-off against Sportist Svoge, which Vidima won after a penalty shoot-out.

In the 2011-12 season, the team finished 14th in the league, winning only 3 out of 30 matches. As a result, Vidima was relegated once more and competed in B PFG in the 2012-2013 season. The team began experiencing financial problems at the time and was relegated from the B Group in 2013.

FC Sevlievo 
The club re-formed as FC Sevlievo on 4 June 2015, after Vidima Rakovski declared bankruptcy.

Honours
Bulgarian First League:
 12th place (1): 2003–04
Bulgarian Second League:
  Winners (1): 2009–10
  2nd place (1): 2006–07
   3rd place (1): 2002–03
Bulgarian Cup:
 Quarter-finals: - 2003–04
Cup of Bulgarian Amateur Football League
  Winners (1): 1998/99

Players

First-team squad

Managers

League positions

Shirt and sponsors

Past seasons

Sevlievo Ladies

The football club also has a women's sports department named FC Sevlievo Ladies, which participates in the Bulgarian women's football championship.

Past seasons

References

External links
bgclubs.eu
Ladies bgclubs.eu
Sellievo Ladies Facebook

Football clubs in Bulgaria
Association football clubs established in 2015
2015 establishments in Bulgaria